Spanish West Africa (AOE) was a grouping of Spanish colonies along the Atlantic coast of northwest Africa. It was formed in 1946 by joining the southern zone (the Cape Juby Strip) of the Spanish protectorate in Morocco with the colonies of Ifni, Saguia el-Hamra and Río de Oro into a single administrative unit. Following the Ifni War (1957–58), Spain ceded the Cape Juby Strip to Morocco by the Treaty of Angra de Cintra, and created separate provinces for Ifni and the Sahara in 1958.

Spanish West Africa was formed by a decree of 20 July 1946. The new governor sat at Ifni. He was ex officio the delegate of the Spanish high commissioner in Morocco in the southern zone of the protectorate, to facilitate its government along the same lines as the other Spanish possessions on the coast. On 12 July 1947, Ifni and the Sahara were raised into distinct entities, but still under the authority of the governor in Ifni. On 10 and 14 January 1958, respectively, the Sahara and Ifni were raised into regular Spanish overseas provinces completely independent of one another.

Governors

References

Further reading
 José Antonio Rodriguez Esteban, "El Mapa del África Occidental Española de 1949 a escala 1:500.000: orgullo militar, camelladas y juegos poéticos saharauis", Cybergeo: European Journal of Geography. Online since 20 January 2011.

Spanish Africa
Spanish Sahara
History of Western Sahara
History of West Africa
History of Morocco
Colonial history of Morocco
20th century in Morocco
States and territories established in 1946
States and territories disestablished in 1958
1946 establishments in Africa
1958 disestablishments in Africa
Former countries in Africa
Former colonies in Africa
Former Spanish colonies